Nguyễn Quang Bích (chữ Hán: 阮光碧, 1832 – 1890) was a Vietnamese poet and independence activist. He was one of the leaders of the royalist Cẩn Vương ("Serve the King") Movement against the French in northem Vietnam.

References

Vietnamese male poets
Vietnamese Confucianists
1832 births
1890 deaths